Noel Kinazo Felongco is a Filipino lawyer and government official who currently serves as the Lead Convenor of the National Anti-Poverty Commission of the Philippines under the Duterte administration since October 31, 2018. He previously served as a chairperson of the Presidential Commission for the Urban Poor and as an undersecretary of the Department of Environment and Natural Resources (DENR).

Early life and education 
Felongco grew up in Norala, South Cotabato and Cotabato City where he graduated with a bachelor's degree on philosophy and law at Notre Dame University. He was admitted to the Philippine Bar on March 14, 1994.

Career 
Felongco started as a president of the Central Visayas chapter of Partido Demokratiko Pilipino–Laban ng Bayan (PDP–Laban) and later on as a two-term councilor of Cotabato City from 1998 to 2004.

From 2008 to 2010, he was tapped to serve as one of the commissioners of the National Commission on Indigenous Peoples (NCIP) under the administration of then president Gloria Macapagal Arroyo.

On November 16, 2016, he was appointed by President Duterte to serve as the Undersecretary for Solid Waste Management and Local Government Units Concerns in DENR. He was later appointed as the Chairperson of the Presidential Commission for the Urban Poor (PCUP).

He was appointed as the Lead Convenor of the National Anti-Poverty Commission on October 31, 2018, replacing Liza Maza who resigned on August 20, 2018.

References 

Living people
People from Cotabato City
Duterte administration cabinet members
Year of birth missing (living people)